Donald Howard Menzel (April 11, 1901 – December 14, 1976) was one of the first theoretical astronomers and astrophysicists in the United States. He discovered the physical properties of the solar chromosphere, the chemistry of stars, the atmosphere of Mars, and the nature of gaseous nebulae.

Biography
Born in Florence, Colorado in 1901 and raised in Leadville, he learned to read very early, and soon could send and receive messages in Morse code, taught by his father. He loved science and mathematics, collected ore and rock specimens, and as a teenager he built a large chemistry laboratory in the cellar.  He made a radio transmitter at a time when kits were rarely available and qualified as a radio ham.  He was an Eagle Scout, specializing in cryptanalysis, as well as an outdoorsman, hiking and fly fishing throughout much of his life.  He married Florence Elizabeth Kreager on June 17, 1926 and had two daughters (Suzanne Kay and Elizabeth Ina).

At 16, he enrolled in the University of Denver to study chemistry. His interest in astronomy was aroused through a boyhood friend (Edgar Kettering), through observing the solar eclipse of June 8, 1918, and through observing the eruption of Nova Aquilae 1918 (V603 Aquilae). He graduated from the University of Denver in 1920 with a bachelor's degree in chemistry and stayed on to receive a master's degree in chemistry and mathematics from the institution in 1921. He also found summer positions in 1922, 1923, and 1924 as research assistant to Harlow Shapley at the Harvard College Observatory.

At Princeton University he acquired a second master's degree in astronomy in 1923, and in 1924 a Ph.D. in astrophysics for which his advisor was Henry Norris Russell, who inspired his interest in theoretical astronomy. After teaching for two years at the University of Iowa and Ohio State University, in 1926 he was appointed assistant professor at Lick Observatory of the University of California in San Jose, California, where he worked for several years. He moved to Harvard University in 1932.

During World War II, Menzel was commissioned as a lieutenant commander in the United States Navy and asked to head a division of intelligence, where he used his many-sided talents, including deciphering enemy codes. Even until 1955, he worked with the Navy improving radio-wave propagation by tracking the Sun's emissions and studying the effect of the aurora on radio propagation for the Department of Defense (Menzel & Boyd, p. 60). Returning to Harvard after the war, he was appointed acting director of the Harvard Observatory in 1952, and was the full director from 1954 to 1966. The term "Menzel Gap" was used to refer to the absence of astronomical photographic plates during a brief period in the 1950s when plate-making operations were temporarily halted by Menzel as a cost-cutting measure. He retired from Harvard in 1971. From 1964 to his death, Menzel was a U.S. State Department consultant for Latin American affairs.

He received honorary A.M. and Sc.D. degrees from Harvard University in 1942 and the University of Denver in 1954 respectively. From 1946 to 1948 he was the vice president of the American Astronomical Society, becoming their president from 1954 to 1956. In 1965, Menzel was given the John Evans Award of the University of Denver. In May 2001, the Center for Astrophysics  Harvard & Smithsonian hosted "Donald H. Menzel: Scientist, Educator, Builder," a symposium in honor of the 100th anniversary of the birth of Donald H. Menzel.

Menzel traveled with several expeditions to view solar eclipses to obtain scientific data. On 19 June 1936, he led the Harvard-MIT expedition to the steppes of Russia (at Ak Bulak in southwestern Siberia) to observe a total eclipse. For the 9 July 1945 eclipse, he directed the Joint U.S.-Canadian expedition to Saskatchewan, although they were clouded out. Menzel observed many total solar eclipses, often leading the expeditions, including Catalina, California (10 September 1923, cloudy), Camptonville, California (28 April 1930), Fryeburg, Maine (31 August 1932), Minneapolis-St. Paul, Minnesota (30 June 1954), the Atlantic coast of Massachusetts (2 October 1959), northern Italy (15 February 1951), Orono, Maine (20 July 1963, cloudy), Athens/Sunion Road, Greece (20 May 1966), Arequipa, Peru (12 November 1966), Miahuatlan, south of Oaxaca, Mexico (7 March 1970), Prince Edward Island Canada (10 July 1972), and western Mauritania (30 June 1973), in addition to the other three mentioned above. He proudly held the informal record for greatest number of observed solar eclipses, a "title" later broken by his student, colleague, and co-author Jay Pasachoff.

In the late 1930s he built an observatory for solar research at Climax, CO, using a telescope that mimicked a total eclipse of the sun, allowing him and his colleagues to study the solar corona and to film the spouting flames, called prominences, emitted by the Sun. Menzel initially performed solar research, but later concentrated on studying gaseous nebulae. His work with Lawrence Aller and James Gilbert Baker defined many of the fundamental principles of the study of planetary nebulae. He wrote the first edition (1964) of A Field Guide to the Stars and Planets, part of the Peterson Field Guides. In one of his last papers, Menzel concluded, based on his analysis of the Schwarzschild equations, that black holes do not exist, and he declared them to be a myth.

He also believed in the EPH (exploded planet hypothesis), stating, 'Presque toutes ces petites planètes circulent entre les orbites de Mars et Jupiter. On admet qu'elles représentent les fragments dispersés d'une grande planète qui se serait désintégrée.'

Menzel was a science fiction author; his "Fin's Funeral" appeared in Galaxy Science Fiction in 1965. He was also an artist, creating watercolor paintings of alien creatures and scenes which often featured 3-dimensional "holes" though characters, clouds, and alien spaceships.

Menzel's Field Guide

Menzel wrote the first edition of A Field Guide to the Stars and Planets, published in 1975 by HarperCollins, which rapidly became a best-seller.  Subsequent editions were prepared after Menzel's death by his student Jay Pasachoff; the current version is one of the Peterson Field Guides.

In Chapter IV of the first edition, Menzel apportions all 88 of the modern constellations recognized by the International Astronomical Union into 8 broad families, as a way to help observers remember where the constellations are located.

The families are organized by common location or common theme.  The Ursa Major, Perseus, Hercules, and Orion families include mainly constellations in the general vicinity of those four constellations. The Zodiac family includes the traditional 12 Zodiac constellations.  The Heavenly Waters family includes mostly constellations generally associated with water.  The Bayer family includes southern constellations first introduced by Plancius and subsequently included in Johann Bayer's Uranometria in 1603. The La Caille family includes most of the constellations introduced by Lacaille in 1756 from stars charted during his observations at Cape Town.

Menzel and UFOs

The Psychological Strategy Board commissioned Menzel to advocate for skepticism concerning the reality of UFOs. He authored or co-authored three popular books to debunk UFOs: Flying Saucers – Myth – Truth – History (1953), The World of Flying Saucers (1963, co-authored with Lyle G Boyd), and The UFO Enigma (1977, co-authored with Ernest H. Taves).  All of Menzel's UFO books argued that UFOs are nothing more than misidentification of prosaic phenomena such as stars, clouds and airplanes; or the result of people seeing unusual atmospheric phenomena they were unfamiliar with. He was among the first prominent scientists to offer an opinion on the matter. One of Menzel's earliest public involvements in UFO matters was his appearance on a radio documentary directed and narrated by Edward R. Murrow in mid-1950. (Swords, 98)

Menzel claimed to have his own UFO experience on 3 March 1955 while returning from the North Pole on the daily Air Force Weather "Ptarmigan" flight. His account is in both Menzel & Boyd and Menzel & Taves, in which he identified the 'flying saucer' he observed, as a mirage of Sirius (Steuart Campbell claimed that it was a mirage of Saturn). Menzel often explained that atmospheric hazes or temperature inversions could distort stars or planets, and make them appear to be larger than in reality, unusual in their shape, and in motion.

In 1968, Menzel testified before the U.S. House Committee on Science and Astronautics – Symposium on UFOs, stating that he considered all UFO sightings to have natural explanations.

Legacy

The minor planet 1967 Menzel was named in his honor, as well as a small lunar crater located in the southeast of Mare Tranquilitatis, the Sea of Tranquility.

Notes

Sources

Publications
Menzel published over 270 scientific and other papers.
 
 
 
 
 
 
 
 
 
 
 
 
 
 
 
 
 
 
 
 
 
 
 
 
 
 
 
 
 
 

He also wrote a popular account of astronomy:  A Field Guide to the Stars and Planets Including the Moon, Satellites, Comets and Other Features of the Universe (1975); 2nd edition (1984) by Menzel and Pasachoff, 3rd edition (1992) by Pasachoff and Menzel, 4th edition (2000) by Pasachoff.

External links
 
 UFOs: Fact or Fiction? by Donald H. Menzel (1968)

1901 births
1976 deaths
Harvard University faculty
American astronomers
American skeptics
American astrophysicists
Solar observatories
UFO skeptics
University of Colorado alumni
University of Denver alumni
Princeton University alumni
University of Iowa faculty
Ohio State University faculty
People from Florence, Colorado
People from Leadville, Colorado
Harvard College Observatory people
Amateur radio people